Bukovec is a village and municipality in Košice-okolie District in the Košice Region of eastern Slovakia.

History
In historical records the village was first mentioned in 1609.

Geography

The municipality lies at an altitude 360 metres and covers an area of 10.852 km2. It has a population of about 700 people.

Genealogical resources

The records for genealogical research are available at the state archive "Statny Archiv in Kosice, Slovakia"

 Roman Catholic church records (births/marriages/deaths): 1738-1896 (parish B)
 Greek Catholic church records (births/marriages/deaths): 1850-1911 (parish B)

See also
 List of municipalities and towns in Slovakia

References

External links
https://web.archive.org/web/20071217080336/http://www.statistics.sk/mosmis/eng/run.html
Surnames of living people in Bukovec

Villages and municipalities in Košice-okolie District